The 1981 Lamar Cardinals football team represented Lamar University in the 1981 NCAA Division I-A football season as a member of the Southland Conference.  The Cardinals played their home games at Cardinal Stadium now named Provost Umphrey Stadium in Beaumont, Texas.  Lamar finished the 1981 season with a 4–6–1 overall record and a 1–3–1 conference record.  A highlight for the season was a last second victory over the defending Southwest Conference champion Baylor Bears at the Bears' home field, Floyd Casey Stadium in Waco, Texas.

Postseason

Move to NCAA Division I-AA

The 1981 season marked the Cardinals' final season at the NCAA Division I-A level.  The Southland Conference along with several other conferences including the Ivy League, Southern Conference, several members of the Missouri Valley Conference, as well as several other teams were forced down to NCAA Division I-AA after failing to meet attendance / stadium size attendance requirements.

Head coach resignation
The 1981 season was Larry Kennan's last season as the Cardinals' head football coach.  Kennan left the team after the conclusion of the 1981 season to take an assistant coaching position with the Los Angeles Rams.

Schedule

References

Lamar
Lamar Cardinals football seasons
Lamar Cardinals football